Broomhill Football Club was a Northern Irish football club based in Richhill, County Armagh, which last played in the Intermediate Division A of the Mid-Ulster Football League. The club was founded in 1977, but merged in 2016 with Richhill to form Richhill A.F.C. Club colours are orange and blue.

The club participated in the Irish Cup.

References

Defunct association football clubs in Northern Ireland
2016 disestablishments in Northern Ireland
1977 establishments in Northern Ireland
Association football clubs in County Armagh
Association football clubs established in 1977
Association football clubs disestablished in 2016
Mid-Ulster Football League clubs